Force is a comune (municipality) in the Province of Ascoli Piceno in the Italian region Marche, located about  south of Ancona and about  northwest of Ascoli Piceno.

The name of "Force" derive from the Italian word for "pitchfork", as it is located between the valleys of the rivers Aso, Tesino and Tronto. The settlement dates back to the 5th century AD, when, because of the barbarian invasions, peoples from neighboring hamlets  found shelter because of its strategic defensive position.

Sights include the Cottage Verrucci (1936), and the Convent of the Blessed Maria Assunta Pallotta.

Activities in the town include processing of copper.

References

Cities and towns in the Marche